Stephen Return Riggs (March 23, 1812 – August 24, 1883) was a Christian missionary and linguist who lived and worked among the Dakota people.

Riggs was born in Steubenville, Ohio. His career among the Dakota began in 1837 at Lac qui Parle in what is now Minnesota, where there was a mission. He worked among the Dakota Sioux for the remainder of his life, producing a grammar and dictionary and a translation of the New Testament

In his autobiography Mary and I, or Forty Years with the Sioux, Riggs describes his life. In 1862, he served as interpreter at the trials of the Sioux Uprising. He died in Beloit, Wisconsin.

Selected works
 1852 A Grammar and Dictionary of the Dakota Language
 1871 Dakota wowapi wakan kin. The New Testament, in the Dakota language
 1880 Mary and I, or Forty Years with the Sioux

Archival collections 
The Presbyterian Historical Society in Philadelphia, Pennsylvania, has Stephen Return Riggs' papers, including detailed correspondence written by Stephen and Mary Riggs to their family members and two manuscript church histories written by Stephen Riggs. The correspondence also includes an occasional sketch of the missions they served.

Family
Riggs's daughter Cornelia was the wife of journalist Julius A. Truesdell and mother of Major General Karl Truesdell.

References

External links
 Stephen Return Riggs in MNopedia, the Minnesota Encyclopedia 
 
 
 

People from Steubenville, Ohio
Linguists from the United States
Missionary linguists
American Protestant missionaries
Protestant missionaries in the United States
Translators of the Bible into indigenous languages of the Americas
1812 births
1883 deaths
19th-century translators
Linguists of Siouan languages